The Canadian province of British Columbia has a system of numbered highways that travel between various cities and regions with onward connections to neighboring provinces and U.S. states. The numbering scheme, announced in March 1940, includes route numbers that reflect United States Numbered Highways that continue south of the Canada–United States border. Highway 1 is numbered in accordance with other routes on the Trans-Canada Highway system.

Major routes

East-west
 The Trans-Canada Highway (Highway 1) runs from Victoria to Nanaimo on Vancouver Island. Then, after a ferry ride to the mainland, it continues from Horseshoe Bay, through the Vancouver area, Abbotsford, Hope, Kamloops, Salmon Arm, and Revelstoke to Kicking Horse Pass on the BC/Alberta border. This is the major east-west route in the province.
 The Crowsnest Highway (Highway 3) runs from Hope, then through Osoyoos, Castlegar, Cranbrook, right to Crowsnest Pass on the BC/Alberta border. This is a southern alternate route to the Trans-Canada, and runs very close to the Canada–US border.
 The Yellowhead/Trans-Canada Highway (Highway 16) starts on Haida Gwaii. After a ferry ride to the mainland, it runs from Prince Rupert through Smithers and Prince George, and then meets the Alberta border at Yellowhead Pass.
 The Lougheed Highway (Highway 7) is a major alternate route that runs from Vancouver to Hope, north of the Fraser River.
 The Okanagan Connector (Highway 97C) is a short but major route that connects the Okanagan Valley to the Coquihalla Highway (Highway 5) at Merritt.  97C branches off Highway 97 at Peachland, about midway between Penticton and Kelowna.

North-south
 The Island Highway (Highway 19) is an extension of Highway 1 on Vancouver Island. It runs from Nanaimo and provides access to all points northbound on Vancouver Island, including Parksville, Courtenay, Comox, Campbell River, and Port Hardy.
 The Patricia Bay Highway (Highway 17) starts in Victoria and heads northbound through Saanich to the Swartz Bay ferry terminal. Recently, there was a gap between the segments of Highway 17 (now filled in with the SFPR), as the Mainland portion was designated as Highway 17A.  The new South Fraser Perimeter Road has been named as Highway 17, and presently is open in Delta and Surrey between Highway 17a and Highway 15.
 Highway 99 starts as an extension of Interstate 5 at the Canada–US border in Surrey as a freeway until entering the city of Vancouver.  There it becomes a series of various heavily signalized major city core thoroughfares, notably Granville Street and Georgia Street. After crossing the Lions Gate Bridge, the highway - now known as the Sea-to-Sky Highway, is a two-to-four lane route that accesses Squamish and Whistler, before veering east and meeting with Highway 97 north of Cache Creek.
 The Coquihalla/Southern Yellowhead Highway (Highway 5) is a freeway that bypasses the slower Fraser Canyon portion of the Trans Canada Highway, connecting the cities of Hope, Merritt, and Kamloops. The segment between Hope and Merritt was a toll highway until 2008. North of Kamloops, the route is known as the Southern Yellowhead Highway, and meets up with the main route of the Yellowhead Highway near the Alberta border.
 Highway 97 is the longest highway in the province. The highway starts at the Canada–US border near Osoyoos. The highway, here known as the Okanagan Highway, passes through the major Okanagan Valley cities of Penticton, West Kelowna, Kelowna, and Vernon, before ending in Kamloops. From Kamloops, it is known as the Cariboo Highway, and passes through Cache Creek, Williams Lake, Quesnel, and ends in Prince George. North from there, it is known as the John Hart Highway, and ends in Dawson Creek. From there, the highway then is known as the famed Alaska Highway, and travels northwest through the province until it reaches the Yukon border.

Route list
List is current as of May 2017, according to the British Columbia Ministry of Transportation. All routes are signed with the standard "BC Primary Highway Marker" shield, except where stated as "Unsigned", signed under a street name, signed with the Trans-Canada, Yellowhead, Crowsnest, or Nisga'a route marker, or cosigned with any combination of the above, in the "Notes" column.
{| class="wikitable sortable"
|-
!Route
!Length (km)
!Length (mi)
!class="unsortable"|Southern or western terminus
!class="unsortable"|Northern or eastern terminus
!class="unsortable"|Local name(s)
!Opened
!Removed
!class="unsortable"|Notes
|-
|style="background: #f2f2f2;" | Hwy 1 (TCH)
|116
|72
|Victoria
| Departure Bay ferry terminal in Nanaimo
| Trans-Canada Highway (Vancouver Island section), Douglas Street, Island Highway, Esplanade, Nicol Street, Terminal Avenue, Stewart Avenue
|1941
|Current
|Vancouver Island section; signed with the TCH marker.
|-
|style="background: #f2f2f2;" | Hwy 1 (TCH)
|993
|617
| Horseshoe Bay ferry terminal in West Vancouver
|Hwy 1 (TCH) at Alberta border at Kicking Horse Pass
| Trans-Canada Highway (Mainland section), Upper-Levels Highway, "The Number 1", Highway of Heroes, "The Fraser Canyon"
|1941
|Current
|Mainland section; signed with the TCH marker. Passes through Greater Vancouver and Kamloops.
|-
|style="background: #f2f2f2;" | Hwy 1
|style="background: #d3d3d3" |122
|style="background: #d3d3d3" |76
|style="background: #d3d3d3" |Nanaimo
|style="background: #d3d3d3" |Kelsey Bay
|style="background: #d3d3d3" |Island Highway
|style="background: #d3d3d3" |1941
|style="background: #d3d3d3" |1953
|style="background: #d3d3d3" |Passed through Courtenay and Campbell River. Section replaced by Hwy 19 in 1953. 
|-
|style="background: #f2f2f2;" | Hwy 1A
|17
|11
|Hwy 1 (TCH) in North Cowichan
|Hwy 1 (TCH) south of Ladysmith
|Chemainus Road, Mt. Sicker Road
|1950
|Current
|Route is unsigned. Old alignment of Highway 1 north of Mt. Sicker Road.
|-
|style="background: #f2f2f2;" | Hwy 1A
|style="background: #d3d3d3" |16
|style="background: #d3d3d3" |10
|style="background: #d3d3d3" |Hwy 1 in Victoria
|style="background: #d3d3d3" |Hwy 1 near Langford
|style="background: #d3d3d3" |Gorge Road, Admirals Road, Old Island Highway, Goldstream Avenue
|style="background: #d3d3d3" |1956
|style="background: #d3d3d3" | 1990s
|style="background: #d3d3d3" |Former Hwy 1 in Victoria
|-
|style="background: #f2f2f2;" | Hwy 1A
|style="background: #d3d3d3" |16
|style="background: #d3d3d3" |10
|style="background: #d3d3d3" |Former Hwy 1 in Parksville
|style="background: #d3d3d3" |Port Alberni
|style="background: #d3d3d3" |Alberni Highway
|style="background: #d3d3d3" |1942
|style="background: #d3d3d3" |1953
|style="background: #d3d3d3" |Replaced by Hwy 4.
|-
|style="background: #f2f2f2;" | Hwy 1A
|style="background: #d3d3d3" |4
|style="background: #d3d3d3" |2
|style="background: #d3d3d3" |Hwy 1 in West Vancouver
|style="background: #d3d3d3" |Hwy 99 in Vancouver
|style="background: #d3d3d3" | Taylor Way, Marine Drive, Stanley Park Causeway, Georgia Street
|style="background: #d3d3d3" |1972
|style="background: #d3d3d3" |2016
|style="background: #d3d3d3" |Old alignment of Hwy 1 through West Vancouver, Stanley Park, and Downtown Vancouver via Lions Gate Bridge.
|-
|style="background: #f2f2f2;" | Hwy 1A
|style="background: #d3d3d3" |28
|style="background: #d3d3d3" |17
|style="background: #d3d3d3" |Hwy 99 in Vancouver
|style="background: #d3d3d3" |Hwy 1 in Abbotsford
|style="background: #d3d3d3" |Kingsway, 10th Avenue, McBride Boulevard, King George Boulevard, Fraser Highway
|style="background: #d3d3d3" |1972
|style="background: #d3d3d3" |2006
|style="background: #d3d3d3" |Old alignment of Hwy 1 through Downtown Vancouver, Burnaby, Surrey (via Pattullo Bridge), and Abbotsford.
|-
|style="background: #f2f2f2;" | Hwy 1A
|style="background: #d3d3d3" |18
|style="background: #d3d3d3" |11
|style="background: #d3d3d3" |Hwy 1 in Chilliwack
|style="background: #d3d3d3" |Hwy 9 near Popkum
|style="background: #d3d3d3" | Vedder Road, Old Yale Road
|style="background: #d3d3d3" |1972
|style="background: #d3d3d3" | 1990s
|style="background: #d3d3d3" |Old alignment of Hwy 1 through Chilliwack.
|-
|style="background: #f2f2f2;" | Hwy 1B
|style="background: #d3d3d3" |94
|style="background: #d3d3d3" |58
|style="background: #d3d3d3" |Hwy 95 in Radium Hot Springs
|style="background: #d3d3d3" |Alberta border at Vermilion Pass
|style="background: #d3d3d3" |Banff–Windermere Parkway
|style="background: #d3d3d3" |1941
|style="background: #d3d3d3" |1959
|style="background: #d3d3d3" |Replaced by Hwy 93
|-
|style="background: #f2f2f2;" | Hwy 2
|42
|26
|Hwy 97 in Dawson Creek
|Hwy 43 at Alberta border near Tupper
|Alaska Avenue, 8 Street, Dawson Creek–Tupper Highway, 50th Street, 50th Avenue
|1941
|Current
|—
|-
|style="background: #f2f2f2;" | Hwy 2
|style="background: #d3d3d3" |845
|style="background: #d3d3d3" |525
|style="background: #d3d3d3" |Hwy 1 in Cache Creek
|style="background: #d3d3d3" |Dawson Creek
|style="background: #d3d3d3" |Cariboo Highway, John Hart Highway
|style="background: #d3d3d3" |1941
|style="background: #d3d3d3" |1962
|style="background: #d3d3d3" |Passed through Prince George. Cosigned with Hwy 97 from 1953-1962 before the Hwy 2 was removed.
|-
|style="background: #f2f2f2;" | Hwy 3
|838
|521
|Hwy 1 (TCH) near Hope
|Hwy 3 at Alberta border at Crowsnest Pass
| Crowsnest Highway, Hope–Princeton Highway
|1941
|Current
|Signed with the "Crowsnest" marker.
|-
|style="background: #f2f2f2;" | Hwy 3
|style="background: #d3d3d3" |108
|style="background: #d3d3d3" |67
|style="background: #d3d3d3" |Cascade City
|style="background: #d3d3d3" |Castlegar
|style="background: #d3d3d3" |Southern Interprovincial Highway, Santa Rosa Road
|style="background: #d3d3d3" |1941
|style="background: #d3d3d3" | 1962
|style="background: #d3d3d3" |Cascade City – Rossland section decommissioned; Rossland – Castlegar section replaced by Hwy 22.
|-
|style="background: #f2f2f2;" | Hwy 3A
|32
|20
|Hwy 3 in Keremeos
|Hwy 97 near Kaleden
|—
|1965
|Current
|Old alignment of Hwy 3;  concurrency with Hwy 97 between Kaleden and Osoyoos was dropped in the 2000s.
|-
|style="background: #f2f2f2;" | Hwy 3A
|154
|96
|Hwy 3 in Castlegar
|Hwy 3 in Creston
|Vernon Street, Ward Street, Front Street, Anderson Street, Nelson Avenue
|1964
|Current
|Old alignment of Hwy 3; passes through Nelson and Kootenay Lake Ferry.
|-
|style="background: #f2f2f2;" | Hwy 3A
|style="background: #d3d3d3" |81
|style="background: #d3d3d3" |50
|style="background: #d3d3d3" |Former Hwy 3 in Trail
|style="background: #d3d3d3" |Hwy 6 / former Hwy 3 in Nelson
|style="background: #d3d3d3" |—
|style="background: #d3d3d3" | 1953
|style="background: #d3d3d3" | 1964
|style="background: #d3d3d3" |Cosigned with Hwy 6 between Salmo and Nelson; replaced by sections of Hwy 3B and Hwy 3.
|-
|style="background: #f2f2f2;" | Hwy 3A
|style="background: #d3d3d3" |46
|style="background: #d3d3d3" |29
|style="background: #d3d3d3" |Hwy 3 in Keremeos
|style="background: #d3d3d3" |Hwy 97 in  Osoyoos
|style="background: #d3d3d3" |Richter Pass Highway
|style="background: #d3d3d3" |1965
|style="background: #d3d3d3" |c. 1967
|style="background: #d3d3d3" |Replaced by rerouting of Hwy 3
|-
|style="background: #f2f2f2;" | Hwy 3B
|68
|42
|Hwy 3 near Nancy Greene Provincial Park
|Hwy 3 near Erie
| Victoria Street, Bailey Street, 10th Avenue, Kootenay Avenue, Main Street
|1967
|Current
|Old alignment of Hwy 3 and Hwy 3A; passes through Rossland and Trail.
|-
|style="background: #f2f2f2;" | Hwy 4
|162
|101
|Tofino
|Hwy 19 near Qualicum Beach
|First Street, Campbell Street, Pacific Rim Highway, River Road, Johnston Road, Alberni Highway, Surf Highway
|1953
|Current
|Passes through Port Alberni.
|-
|style="background: #f2f2f2;" | Hwy 4
|style="background: #d3d3d3" |263
|style="background: #d3d3d3" |163
|style="background: #d3d3d3" |Hwy 3 in Cranbrook
|style="background: #d3d3d3" |Hwy 1 in Golden
|style="background: #d3d3d3" |—
|style="background: #d3d3d3" |1941
|style="background: #d3d3d3" | 1952
|style="background: #d3d3d3" |Replaced by Hwy 95.
|-
|style="background: #f2f2f2;" | Hwy 4A
|10
|6
|Hwy 4 near Coombs
|Hwy 19 near Parksville
|Old Alberni Highway
|1996
|Current
|Old alignment of Hwy 4.
|-
|style="background: #f2f2f2;" | Hwy 4A
|style="background: #d3d3d3" |6
|style="background: #d3d3d3" |4
|style="background: #d3d3d3" |Hwy 4 near Coombs
|style="background: #d3d3d3" |Hwy 19 in Qualicum Beach
|style="background: #d3d3d3" |—
|style="background: #d3d3d3" |1968
|style="background: #d3d3d3" |1996
|style="background: #d3d3d3" |Replaced by Hwy 4.
|-
|style="background: #f2f2f2;" | Hwy 5
|543
|337
|Hwy 1 (TCH) near Hope
|Hwy 16 (TCH) near Tête Jaune Cache
| Southern Yellowhead Highway, Coquihalla Highway (Kamloops–Hope)
|1953
|Current
|Passes through Merritt and Kamloops; signed with the "Yellowhead" marker. 
|-
|style="background: #f2f2f2;" | Hwy 5
|style="background: #d3d3d3" |184
|style="background: #d3d3d3" |114
|style="background: #d3d3d3" |Hwy 3 (now Hwy 3A) at Kaleden
|style="background: #d3d3d3" |Hwy 1 near Salmon Arm
|style="background: #d3d3d3" |—
|style="background: #d3d3d3" |1941
|style="background: #d3d3d3" |1953
|style="background: #d3d3d3" |Replaced by Hwy 97 and Hwy 97A.
|-
|style="background: #f2f2f2;" | Hwy 5A
|182
|113
|Hwy 3 in Princeton
|Hwy 1 (TCH) / Hwy 5 / Hwy 97 in Kamloops
| Tapton Avenue, Princeton-Kamloops Highway, Okanagan Connector, Nicola Avenue, Voght Street
|1986
|Current
|Old alignment of Hwy 5.
|-
|style="background: #f2f2f2;" | Hwy 6
|406
|252
|SR 31 at U.S. border near Nelway
|Hwy 97 in Vernon
|Nelson Nelway Highway, Railway Avenue, Ymir Road, Lake Avenue, Union Street, Kootenay Street, 6th Avenue, Broadway Street, Vernon Street, 25 Avenue
|1941
|Current
|—
|-
|style="background: #f2f2f2;" | Hwy 6
|style="background: #d3d3d3" |81
|style="background: #d3d3d3" |50
|style="background: #d3d3d3" |Hwy 5 (now Hwy 97) near Vernon
|style="background: #d3d3d3" |Hwy 1 at Monte Creek
|style="background: #d3d3d3" |—
|style="background: #d3d3d3" |1941
|style="background: #d3d3d3" |1953
|style="background: #d3d3d3" |Passed through Falkland; replaced by Hwy 97.
|-
|style="background: #f2f2f2;" | Hwy 7
|150
|93
|Hwy 99 in Vancouver
|Hwy 1 (TCH) near Hope
|Broadway Street, Lougheed Highway, Haney Bypass, Railway Avenue/1st Avenue
|1941
|Current
|—
|-
|style="background: #f2f2f2;" | Hwy 7A
|style="background: #d3d3d3" |26
|style="background: #d3d3d3" |16
|style="background: #d3d3d3" |Hwy 99 near Vancouver
|style="background: #d3d3d3" |Hwy 7 in Coquitlam
|style="background: #d3d3d3" |West Pender Street, Burrard Street, Hastings Street, Inlet Drive, Saint Johns Street, Barnet Highway/Barnet Road
|style="background: #d3d3d3" |1953
|style="background: #d3d3d3" |1999
|style="background: #d3d3d3" |Old alignment of Hwy 7.
|-
|style="background: #f2f2f2;" | Hwy 7B
|7
|4
|Hwy 1 (TCH) / Hwy 7 in Coquitlam
|Hwy 7 in Coquitlam
|Mary Hill Bypass
|1996
|Current
|—
|-
|style="background: #f2f2f2;" | Hwy 8
|69
|43
|Hwy 1 (TCH) in Spences Bridge
|Hwy 5 / Hwy 5A / Hwy 97C in Merritt
|Nicola Highway
|1953
|Current
|—
|-
|style="background: #f2f2f2;" | Hwy 9
|16
|10
|Hwy 1 (TCH) at Bridal Falls
|Harrison Hot Springs
|Agassiz–Rosedale Highway, Hot Springs Road
|1953
|Current
|Old alignment of Hwy 7 north of Agassiz
|-
|style="background: #f2f2f2;" | Hwy 10
|27
|17
|Hwy 91 in Delta
|Hwy 1 (TCH) in Langley
|58 Ave, 56 Ave, Langley Bypass, Glover Road, Springbrook Road
|1953
|Current
| section between Hwy 91 and Hwy 17A decommissioned in 2003.
|-
|style="background: #f2f2f2;" | Hwy 11
|17
|11
|SR 9 at U.S. border in Abbotsford
|Hwy 7 in Mission
|Abbotsford–Mission Highway, Sumas Way
|1958
|Current
|—
|-
|style="background: #f2f2f2;" | Hwy 12
|150
|93
|Hwy 1 (TCH) in Lytton
|Hwy 99 in Lillooet
|Lytton–Lillooet Highway
|1953
|Current
| section between Lillooet and Hwy 97 became part Hwy 99 in 1992.
|-
|style="background: #f2f2f2;" | Hwy 13
|12
|7
|SR 539 at U.S. border in Langley
|Hwy 1 (TCH) in Langley
|264th Street
|1958
|Current
|—
|-
|style="background: #f2f2f2;" | Hwy 14
|103
|64
|Hwy 1 (TCH) in Langford
|Port Renfrew
|Veterans Memorial Parkway, Sooke Road, Juan de Fuca Highway, West Coast Road
|1953
|Current
|—
|-
|style="background: #f2f2f2;" | Hwy 15
|20
|12
|SR 543 at U.S. border in Surrey
|Hwy 1 (TCH) / Hwy 17 in Surrey
| Pacific Highway, 176th Street
|1958
|Current
|Formerly numbered as Highway 99A
|-
|style="background: #f2f2f2;" |
|101
|63
|Masset
| Skidegate Ferry Terminal
| Yellowhead Highway (Haida Gwaii section), Trans-Canada Highway (Haida Gwaii section)
|1984
|Current
|Signed with Trans-Canada and Yellowhead markers.
|-
|style="background: #f2f2f2;" |  Hwy 16 (TCH)
|1,072
|666
| Prince Rupert ferry terminal
|Hwy 16 (TCH) at Alberta border at Yellowhead Pass
| Yellowhead Highway (Mainland section), Trans-Canada Highway (Mainland section), Highway of Tears
|1953
|Current
|Passes through Prince George. Signed with Trans-Canada and Yellowhead markers.
|-
|style="background: #f2f2f2;" | Hwy 17
|33
|21
|Victoria
| Swartz Bay ferry terminal
|Belleville Street, Blanshard Street/Vernon Avenue, Patricia Bay Highway
|1960
|Current
|—
|-
|style="background: #f2f2f2;" | Hwy 17
|44
|27
| Tsawwassen ferry terminal
|Hwy 1 (TCH) / Hwy 15 in Surrey
|Tsawassen Highway, South Fraser Perimeter Road
|1960
|Current
|—
|-
|style="background: #f2f2f2;" | Hwy 17A
|6
|4
|Hwy 17 in Delta
|Hwy 99 in Delta
|Tsawassen Highway
|2012
|Current
|Old alignment of Hwy 17.
|-
|style="background: #f2f2f2;" | Hwy 17A
|style="background: #d3d3d3" |5
|style="background: #d3d3d3" |3
|style="background: #d3d3d3" |Hwy 17 in Saanich
|style="background: #d3d3d3" |Hwy 7 in North Saanich
|style="background: #d3d3d3" |West Saanich Road, Wain Road
|style="background: #d3d3d3" |1962
|style="background: #d3d3d3" |2002
|style="background: #d3d3d3" |—
|-
|style="background: #f2f2f2;" | Hwy 18
|42
|26
|Youbou
|Hwy 1 (TCH) in Duncan
|Cowichan Valley Highway
|1953
|Current
|—
|-
|style="background: #f2f2f2;" | Hwy 19
|377
|234
| Duke Point ferry terminal near Nanaimo
| Bear Cove ferry terminal near Port Hardy
| Duke Point Highway, Nanaimo Parkway, Inland Island Highway, Ginger Goodwin Way, Tamarac Street/Willow Street, Island Highway, Bear Cove Highway
|1953
|Current
|—
|-
|style="background: #f2f2f2;" | Hwy 19A
|12
|7
|Hwy 1 (TCH) in Nanaimo
|Hwy 19 in Nanaimo
| Terminal Avenue, (Old) Island Highway
|1996
|Current
|Old alignment of Hwy 19 through Nanaimo (business route).
|-
|style="background: #f2f2f2;" | Hwy 19A
|123
|76
|Hwy 19 near Parksville.
|Hwy 19 / Hwy 28 in Campbell River.
| (Old) Island Highway, Oceanside Route, Cliffe Avenue
|1996
|Current
|Old alignment of Hwy 19.
|-
|style="background: #f2f2f2;" | Hwy 20
|457
|284
|Bella Coola
|Hwy 97 in Williams Lake
| Chilcotin Highway, Alexander MacKenzie Highway
|1953
|Current
|—
|-
|style="background: #f2f2f2;" | Hwy 21
|14
|9
|SH-1 at U.S. border at Rykerts
|Hwy 3 near Creston
|Creston–Rykerts Highway
|1964
|Current
|—
|-
|style="background: #f2f2f2;" | Hwy 22
|46
|29
|SR 25 at U.S. border at Paterson
|Hwy 3 near Castlegar
|Schofield Highway
|1964
|Current
|Old alignment of Hwy 3 between Rossland and Castlegar.
|-
|style="background: #f2f2f2;" | Hwy 22A
|11
|7
|U.S. border at Waneta
|Hwy 3B near Montrose
|Waneta Highway
|1967
|Current
|—
|-
|style="background: #f2f2f2;" | Hwy 23
|248
|154
|Hwy 6 near Nakusp
|Mica Dam
| Canyon Road N, 6 Ave NW
|1964
|Current
|Old alignment of Hwy 1 north of Revelstoke.
|-
|style="background: #f2f2f2;" | Hwy 24
|97
|60
|Hwy 97 near 93 Mile House
|Hwy 5 at Little Fort
|Interlakes Highway
|1967
|Current
|—
|-
|style="background: #f2f2f2;" | Hwy 25
|style="background: #d3d3d3" |59
|style="background: #d3d3d3" |37
|style="background: #d3d3d3" |Kitimat
|style="background: #d3d3d3" |Hwy 16 near Terrace
|style="background: #d3d3d3" |—
|style="background: #d3d3d3" |1967
|style="background: #d3d3d3" |1986
|style="background: #d3d3d3" |Replaced by Hwy 37.
|-
|style="background: #f2f2f2;" | Hwy 26
|82
|51
|Hwy 97 in Quesnel
|Barkerville
| Barkerville Highway, Main Street
|1967
|Current
|—
|-
|style="background: #f2f2f2;" | Hwy 27
|53
|33
|Hwy 16 (TCH) in Vanderhoof
|Fort St. James
|Stuart Lake Highway
|1967
|Current
|—
|-
|style="background: #f2f2f2;" | Hwy 28
|89
|55
|Gold River
|Hwy 19 / Hwy 19A in Campbell River
|Gold River Highway
|1970
|Current
|—
|-
|style="background: #f2f2f2;" | Hwy 29
|236
|147
|Hwy 52 in Tumbler Ridge
|Hwy 97 near Charlie Lake
|Don Phillips Way
|1967
|Current
|—
|-
|style="background: #f2f2f2;" | Hwy 30
|30
|19
|Port Alice
|Hwy 19 between Port Hardy and Port McNeill
|Port Alice Road
|—
|—
|—
|-
|style="background: #f2f2f2;" | Hwy 31
|175
|109
|Hwy 3A in Balfour
|Hwy 23 near Galena Bay
|Balfour-Kaslo-Galena Bay Highway
|1973
|Current
|—
|-
|style="background: #f2f2f2;" | Hwy 31A
|47
|29
|Hwy 6 in New Denver
|Hwy 31 in Kaslo
| 6 Avenue, Victoria Street, Washington Street, A Avenue
|1973
|Current
|—
|-
|style="background: #f2f2f2;" | Hwy 33
|129
|80
|Hwy 3 in Rock Creek
|Hwy 97 in Kelowna
|Kelowna-Rock Creek Highway
|1970
|Current
|—
|-
|style="background: #f2f2f2;" | Hwy 35
|23
|14
|Francois Lake
|Hwy 16 (TCH) at Burns Lake
|North Francois Highway
|1973
|Current
|—
|-
|style="background: #f2f2f2;" | Hwy 37
|879
|546
|Kitimat
|Hwy 37 at Yukon border near Upper Liard, YK
| Stewart–Cassiar Highway, Stikine Highway, Dease Lake Highway
|1975
|Current
|Old alignment of Hwy 25 south of Terrace.
|-
|style="background: #f2f2f2;" | Hwy 37A
|65
|40
|U.S. Border at Stewart and Hyder, Alaska
|Hwy 37 at Meziadin Junction
| Stewart Highway, Glacier Highway
|1984
|Current
|—
|-
|style="background: #f2f2f2;" | Hwy 39
|29
|18
|Hwy 97 near of McLeod Lake
|Mackenzie
|Mackenzie Boulevard
|1975
|Current
|—
|-
|style="background: #f2f2f2;" | Hwy 41
|1.3
|0.8
|SR 21 at U.S. border at Carson
|Hwy 3 near Grand Forks
|Danville Highway
|1968
|Current
|Shortest officially numbered highway in BC. 
|-
|style="background: #f2f2f2;" | Hwy 43
|35
|22
|Hwy 3 in Sparwood
|Elkford
|Elk Valley Highway
|1983
|Current
|—
|-
|style="background: #f2f2f2;" | Hwy 49
|16
|10
|Hwy 2 in Dawson Creek
|Hwy 49 at Alberta border near Dawson Creek
| Spirit River Highway, Northern Woods and Water Route
|1975
|Current
|—
|-
|style="background: #f2f2f2;" | Hwy 52
|243
|151
|Hwy 97 at Arras
|Hwy 2 at Tupper
|Heritage Highway
|1988
|Current
|—
|-
|style="background: #f2f2f2;" | Hwy 77
|138
|86
|Hwy 97 near of Fort Nelson
|Highway 7 at NWT border near Fort Liard, NWT
|Liard Highway
|1986
|Current
|—
|-
|style="background: #f2f2f2;" | Hwy 91
|23
|14
|Hwy 99 in Delta
|Hwy 99 in Richmond
| Annacis Highway, Richmond Freeway, East-West Connector
|1986
|Current
|Connects with Alex Fraser Bridge.
|-
|style="background: #f2f2f2;" | Hwy 91A
|3.5
|2.2
|Hwy 91 in Richmond
|Marine Way in New Westminster
|Queensborough Connector
|1986
|Current
|—
|-
|style="background: #f2f2f2;" | Hwy 93
|321
|199
|US 93 at U.S. border at Roosville
|Hwy 93 at Alberta border at Vermilion Pass
| Banff–Windermere Highway, Kootenay Highway
|1958
|Current
|—
|-
|style="background: #f2f2f2;" | Hwy 95
|329
|204
|US 95 at U.S. border at Kingsgate
|Hwy 1 (TCH) in Golden
|Kootenay–Columbia Highway
|1957
|Current
|—
|-
|style="background: #f2f2f2;" | Hwy 95A
|55
|34
|Hwy 3 / Hwy 95 in Cranbrook
|Hwy 93 / Hwy 95 near Wasa
|Kimberley Highway
|1968
|Current
|Old alignment of Hwy 95 through Kimberley.
|-
|style="background: #f2f2f2;" | Hwy 97
|2,081
|1,293
|US 97 at U.S. border near Osoyoos
|Hwy 1 at Yukon border near Lower Post
| Okanagan Highway, Cariboo Highway, John Hart Highway, Alaska Highway
|1953
|Current
|Passes through Kelowna, Kamloops, Prince George, Dawson Creek, and Fort St. John. Most of the highway north of Fort St. John is managed by Public Works Canada. Longest officially numbered highway in BC. 
|-
|style="background: #f2f2f2;" | Hwy 97A
|65
|40
|Hwy 97 near Vernon
|Hwy 1 (TCH) in Sicamous
| Vernon-Sicamous Highway, Young Street
|1962
|Current
|—
|-
|style="background: #f2f2f2;" | Hwy 97A
|style="background: #d3d3d3" |47
|style="background: #d3d3d3" |29
|style="background: #d3d3d3" |Hwy 97 near Vernon
|style="background: #d3d3d3" |Hwy 1 in Salmon Arm
|style="background: #d3d3d3" |—
|style="background: #d3d3d3" |1953
|style="background: #d3d3d3" |1957
|style="background: #d3d3d3" |Old alignment of Hwy 5, replaced by Hwy 97E.
|-
|style="background: #f2f2f2;" | Hwy 97A
|style="background: #d3d3d3" |10
|style="background: #d3d3d3" |6
|style="background: #d3d3d3" |Hwy 97 near Prince George
|style="background: #d3d3d3" |Hwy 16 near Prince George
|style="background: #d3d3d3" |Old Cariboo Highway
|style="background: #d3d3d3" |1963
|style="background: #d3d3d3" | 2000s
|style="background: #d3d3d3" |Old alignment of Hwy 97.
|-
|style="background: #f2f2f2;" | Hwy 97A
|style="background: #d3d3d3" |3
|style="background: #d3d3d3" |2
|style="background: #d3d3d3" |Hwy 16 in downtown Prince George
|style="background: #d3d3d3" |Hwy 97 near Prince George
|style="background: #d3d3d3" |—
|style="background: #d3d3d3" |—
|style="background: #d3d3d3" | 1990s
|style="background: #d3d3d3" |Old alignment of Hwy 97.
|-
|style="background: #f2f2f2;" | Hwy 97B
|14
|9
|Hwy 97A near Grindrod
|Hwy 1 (TCH) in Salmon Arm
|Grindrod-Salmon Arm Highway
|1962
|Current
|—
|-
|style="background: #f2f2f2;" | Hwy 97C
|224
|139
|Hwy 97 near Peachland
|Hwy 1 (TCH) / Hwy 97 in Cache Creek
| Okanagan Connector, Coquihalla Connector, Harvey Avenue
|1990
|Current
|Passes through Merritt.
|-
|style="background: #f2f2f2;" | Hwy 97D
|28
|17
|Hwy 97C near Logan Lake
|Hwy 5 near Lac le Jeune
|Meadow Creek Road
|2005
|Current
|—
|-
|style="background: #f2f2f2;" | Hwy 97E
|style="background: #d3d3d3" |132
|style="background: #d3d3d3" |82
|style="background: #d3d3d3" |Hwy 97 / Hwy 97W near Vernon
|style="background: #d3d3d3" |Hwy 1 / Hwy 97 / Hwy 97W at Monte Creek
|style="background: #d3d3d3" |—
|style="background: #d3d3d3" |1957
|style="background: #d3d3d3" |1962
|style="background: #d3d3d3" |Passed through Armstrong and Salmon Arm; cosigned with Hwy 1 between Salmon Arm and Monte Creek. Old alignment of Hwy 5, replaced by Hwy 97A and Hwy 97B.
|-
|style="background: #f2f2f2;" | Hwy 97W
|style="background: #d3d3d3" |81
|style="background: #d3d3d3" |50
|style="background: #d3d3d3" |Hwy 97 / Hwy 97E near Vernon
|style="background: #d3d3d3" |Hwy 1 / Hwy 97 / Hwy 97E at Monte Creek
|style="background: #d3d3d3" |—
|style="background: #d3d3d3" |1957
|style="background: #d3d3d3" |1962
|style="background: #d3d3d3" |Passed through Falkland; replaced by Hwy 97.
|-
|style="background: #f2f2f2;" | Hwy 99
|377
|234
|I-5 at U.S. border at Douglas
|Hwy 97 near Cache Creek
| Vancouver-Blaine Highway, Fraser Delta Thruway, Oak Street, 41st Avenue/70th Avenue, Granville Street, Howe Street/Seymour Street, Georgia Street, Stanley Park Causeway, Lions Gate Bridge Road, Marine Drive, Taylor Way, Upper-Levels Highway, Sea to Sky Highway, Squamish Highway, Whistler Highway, Pemberton Portage Road, Lillooet Lake Road, Duffey Lake Road
|1942
|Current
|Passes through Greater Vancouver and Whistler.
|-
|style="background: #f2f2f2;" | Hwy 99A
|style="background: #d3d3d3" |15
|style="background: #d3d3d3" |9
|style="background: #d3d3d3" |U.S. border in Surrey
|style="background: #d3d3d3" |Former Hwy 99 (King George Highway) in Surrey
|style="background: #d3d3d3" |Pacific Highway
|style="background: #d3d3d3" |1942
|style="background: #d3d3d3" |1958
|style="background: #d3d3d3" |Portion cosigned with Hwy 1; replaced by Hwy 15.
|-
|style="background: #f2f2f2;" | Hwy 99A
|style="background: #d3d3d3" |18
|style="background: #d3d3d3" |11
|style="background: #d3d3d3" |Former Hwy 99 (Main Street) in Vancouver
|style="background: #d3d3d3" |Former Hwy 1 / Hwy 99 in New Westminster
|style="background: #d3d3d3" |Grandview Highway
|style="background: #d3d3d3" |1942
|style="background: #d3d3d3" |1962
|style="background: #d3d3d3" |
|-
|style="background: #f2f2f2;" | Hwy 99A
|style="background: #d3d3d3" |50
|style="background: #d3d3d3" |31
|style="background: #d3d3d3" |Hwy 99 in Surrey
|style="background: #d3d3d3" |Hwy 99 in Vancouver
|style="background: #d3d3d3" | King George Highway, Kingsway
|style="background: #d3d3d3" |1973
|style="background: #d3d3d3" |2006
|style="background: #d3d3d3" |Old alignment of Hwy 99.
|-
|style="background: #f2f2f2;" | Hwy 99B
|style="background: #d3d3d3" |30
|style="background: #d3d3d3" |19
|style="background: #d3d3d3" |Hwy 10 in Delta
|style="background: #d3d3d3" |Hwy 1 / Hwy 99 in Vancouver
|style="background: #d3d3d3" |Deas (Island) Throughway
|style="background: #d3d3d3" |1959
|style="background: #d3d3d3" |1962
|style="background: #d3d3d3" |Replace by Hwy 499 (now Hwy 99).
|-
|style="background: #f2f2f2;" | Hwy 101
|152
|94
| Langdale Ferry Terminal
|Lund
| Sunshine Coast Highway, Pan-American Highway 
|1962
|Current
|—
|-
|style="background: #f2f2f2;" | Hwy 113
|169
|105
|Hwy 16 (TCH) near Terrace
|Ging̱olx
|Nisga'a Highway
|2006
|Current
|Signed with the Nisga'a route marker.
|-
|style="background: #f2f2f2;" | Hwy 118
|50
|31
|Hwy 16 (TCH) near Topley
|Granisle
|Topley Landing Road
|2003
|Current
|Route also signed as Topley Landing Road.
|-
|style="background: #f2f2f2;" | Hwy 395
|4
|2
|US 395 at U.S. border at Cascade
|Hwy 3 near Christina Lake
|—
|1973
|Current
|—
|-
|style="background: #f2f2f2;" | Hwy 401 (TCH)
|style="background: #d3d3d3" |122
|style="background: #d3d3d3" |76
|style="background: #d3d3d3" |Hwy 1 / Hwy 99 in West Vancouver
|style="background: #d3d3d3" |Hwy 1 / Hwy 9 at Bridal Falls
|style="background: #d3d3d3" |Trans-Canada Highway
|style="background: #d3d3d3" |1964
|style="background: #d3d3d3" |1973
|style="background: #d3d3d3" |Replaced by Hwy 1.
|-
|style="background: #f2f2f2;" | Hwy 499
|style="background: #d3d3d3" |49
|style="background: #d3d3d3" |30
|style="background: #d3d3d3" |Hwy 99 in Surrey
|style="background: #d3d3d3" |Hwy 99 in Downtown Vancouver
|style="background: #d3d3d3" |Deas (Island) Throughway
|style="background: #d3d3d3" |1964
|style="background: #d3d3d3" |1973
|style="background: #d3d3d3" |Replaced by Hwy 99.
|-
|colspan="9" style="background: #f2f2f2; text-align: center; font-size: 95%;" |  Former Route
|}

Unnumbered highways
The following routes are maintained by the Ministry of Transportation as part of British Columbia's highway system, but they are Currently unnumbered.

Unofficial numbers
Provincially maintained roads with informal or unofficial numbers:

Pseudo routes
Provincially maintained routes which are unnumbered. Route numbered are unsigned and internally referred to as pseudo numbers:

Yukon highways in British Columbia
The following routes are within British Columbia but are considered part of the Yukon highway system.  The Alaska Highway crosses the 60th parallel north, and thus the border with the Yukon, nine times (including six crossings between historic miles 588 and 596), the highway route number changes just once, between Lower Post, B.C., and Watson Lake, Yukon.  The Yukon section east of here is maintained by Public Works Canada as part of the B.C. portion of Highway 97, while the B.C. section west of here is maintained by the Yukon Government as part of Yukon Highway 1.

Defunct Route Numbers
The first two freeways built in British Columbia were given 400-series numbers, much like the 400-Series Highways in Ontario.  Highways 401 and 499 were renumbered 1 and 99 respectively in 1973. The section of Highway 37 between Terrace and Kitimat was known as Highway 25 until 1986.  In recent years, many routes have been devolved to regional and/or municipal authorities and have lost their official highway status, notably the Fraser Highway in the Lower Mainland (formerly part of Highway 1A) and West Saanich Road on Vancouver Island (formerly Highway 17A). Also King George Highway through Surrey was renamed by the City in 2010 to King George Boulevard. (formerly British Columbia Highway 99A).

Defunct Lettering System
Prior to 1940, British Columbia classified its major roads with letters.
Ultimately, in 1939 or early 1940, a decision was made by the Department of Public Works (now the British Columbia Ministry of Transportation and Infrastructure) to replace the lettering system with the familiar number system. This transition took place during the 1940/1941 fiscal year and led to the installation of route markers along multiple highways.

References

External links

 Official Numbered Routes in British Columbia (British Columbia Ministry of Transportation)
 Map of numbered highways in British Columbia
 British Columbia Highway Cams
 Drive BC
 British Columbia Highways Website

British Columbia provincial highways
Highways